In mathematics, the Chebyshev function is either a scalarising function (Tchebycheff function) or one of two related functions.

The second Chebyshev function  is defined similarly, with the sum extending over all prime powers not exceeding 

where  is the von Mangoldt function. The Chebyshev functions, especially the second one , are often used in proofs related to prime numbers, because it is typically simpler to work with them than with the prime-counting function,  (see the exact formula below.) Both Chebyshev functions are asymptotic to , a statement equivalent to the prime number theorem.

Tchebycheff function, Chebyshev utility function, or weighted Tchebycheff scalarizing function is used when one has several functions to be minimized and one wants to "scalarize" them to a single function:

Often the functions to be minimized are not  but  for some scalars . Then 

All three functions are named in honour of Pafnuty Chebyshev.

Relationships
The second Chebyshev function can be seen to be related to the first by writing it as

A more direct relationship is given by

Note that this last sum has only a finite number of non-vanishing terms, as

The second Chebyshev function is the logarithm of the least common multiple of the integers from 1 to .

Theorem: For , we have

Note: This inequality implies that

Proof: Since , we find that

But from the definition of  we have the trivial inequality

so

Asymptotics and bounds

Furthermore, under the Riemann hypothesis,

for any .

Upper bounds exist for both  and  such that  

for any .

The exact formula

Similarly, the first term, corresponds to the simple pole of the zeta function at 1. It being a pole rather than a zero accounts for the opposite sign of the term.

Properties
A theorem due to Erhard Schmidt states that, for some explicit positive constant , there are infinitely many natural numbers  such that

and infinitely many natural numbers  such that

In little- notation, one may write the above as

Hardy and Littlewood prove the stronger result, that

Relation to primorials

Relation to the prime-counting function
The Chebyshev function can be related to the prime-counting function as follows. Define

Then

Certainly , so for the sake of approximation, this last relation can be recast in the form

The Riemann hypothesis
The Riemann hypothesis states that all nontrivial zeros of the zeta function have real part . In this case, and it can be shown that

By the above, this implies

Good evidence that the hypothesis could be true comes from the fact proposed by Alain Connes and others, that if we differentiate the von Mangoldt formula with respect to  we get . Manipulating, we have the "Trace formula" for the exponential of the Hamiltonian operator satisfying

and

where the "trigonometric sum" can be considered to be the trace of the operator (statistical mechanics) , which is only true if .

Using the semiclassical approach the potential of  satisfies:

solution to this nonlinear integral equation can be obtained (among others) by

in order to obtain the inverse of the potential:

Smoothing function

The smoothing function is defined as

Obviously

Variational formulation

The Chebyshev function evaluated at  minimizes the functional

so

Notes

  Pierre Dusart, "Estimates of some functions over primes without R.H.". 
 Erhard Schmidt, "Über die Anzahl der Primzahlen unter gegebener Grenze", Mathematische Annalen, 57 (1903), pp. 195–204.
 G .H. Hardy and J. E. Littlewood, "Contributions to the Theory of the Riemann Zeta-Function and the Theory of the Distribution of Primes", Acta Mathematica, 41 (1916) pp. 119–196.
 Davenport, Harold (2000). In Multiplicative Number Theory. Springer.  p. 104. . Google Book Search.

References

External links
 
 
 
 Riemann's Explicit Formula, with images and movies

Arithmetic functions